The 1938 Stanley Cup Finals was a best-of-five series between the Chicago Black Hawks and the Toronto Maple Leafs. Chicago won the series 3–1 to win their second Stanley Cup. With their record of 14-25-9, they possess as of 2022, the lowest regular-season winning percentage (.291) of any championship team in the four major professional sports leagues, and are the only ones to do so with a losing record.

This would be the last best-of-five Stanley Cup Finals.

Paths to the Finals
Toronto defeated Boston Bruins in a best-of-five 3–0 to advance to the Finals. The Black Hawks had to play two best-of three series after narrowly reaching the postseason by two points (at the time, six of the eight teams made the postseason); the Black Hawks won a 2–1 upset against Montreal Canadiens and then won 2–1 against the New York Americans to advance to the Finals.

Game summaries
Chicago lost their regular goaltender, Mike Karakas, during the playoffs and started Alfie Moore in game one. League president Frank Calder ruled that Moore was ineligible, but allowed the victory. Paul Goodman played and lost game two. Karakas returned for games three and four wearing a steel toe in his skate to protect his foot.

Chicago set a record with eight American players winning the Stanley Cup. Also set a record for attendance with 18,497 in game three. It was the second time in NHL history a team won the Stanley cup after starting three different goalies in the playoffs after the Detroit Red Wings accomplished the feet in the previous year, no Stanley Cup Champion would win the cup while starting three different goalies until the Penguins did it in 2016. It was the last time that the Hawks would win the Stanley Cup at home until 2015, and the last that a Chicago team would win a championship at Chicago Stadium until the Bulls won their second straight NBA championship in 1992.

The NHL did not see fit to make sure that the Stanley Cup was in Chicago when they won the game and the series on April 12.

Stanley Cup engraving
The 1938 Stanley Cup was presented to Black Hawks captain Johnny Gottselig by NHL President Frank Calder following the Black Hawks 4–1 win over the Maple Leafs in game four.

The following Black Hawks players and staff had their names engraved on the Stanley Cup

1937–38 Chicago Black Hawks

See also
 1937–38 NHL season

References & notes

 Podnieks, Andrew; Hockey Hall of Fame (2004). Lord Stanley's Cup. Bolton, Ont.: Fenn Pub. pp 12, 50. 

Stanley Cup
Stanley Cup Finals
Chicago Blackhawks games
Toronto Maple Leafs games
April 1938 sports events
1930s in Toronto
1930s in Chicago
1938 in Ontario
Stanley
Sports competitions in Chicago